Amélia Muge (born 1952) is a Mozambique-born Portuguese singer, instrumentalist, composer, and lyricist. She is noted for her fado voice and poetic lyrics.

Discography

 Múgica (UPAV, 1992)
 Todos os Dias (Sony, 1994)
 Maio Maduro Maio - with João Afonso and José Mário Branco (Sony, 1995)
 Taco a taco (Polygram, 1998)
 Novas vos Trago (1998)
 A Monte (Vachier, 2002)
 Não Sou Daqui (Vachier, 2007)
 Uma Autora, 202 Canções (Character Ediora, 2009)
 Periplus (2012)

References

1952 births
Living people
Mozambican emigrants to Portugal
People from Maputo
Portuguese women singer-songwriters
Portuguese fado singers
20th-century Portuguese women singers
21st-century Portuguese women singers